You Were Right may refer to:

In Music

Albums
 You Were Right (Brendan Benson album)

Songs
 "You Were Right" (Built to Spill song)
 "You Were Right" (Rüfüs song), from Bloom
 "You Were Right", a song by Badly Drawn Boy from Have You Fed the Fish?
 "You Were Right", a song by Easyworld from This Is Where I Stand